Jens Peter Seipenbusch (born 6 August 1968) is a German politician and physicist who was leader of the Pirate Party Germany.

Seipenbusch, a founding member of his party, studied physics at the University of Münster. He was already party leader from May 2007 to May 2008, and afterwards deputy leader for one year, before he became re-elected leader of the party in July 2009, and once more in May 2010. He did not run again in May 2011.

References

External links

 Jens Seipenbusch (Vorsitzender) , German Pirate Party's website
  Stiftung 42 Podcast #2 – Jens Seipenbusch | Stiftung 42 (42ev.org)

1968 births
Living people
Pirate Party Germany politicians
Leaders of political parties in Germany
21st-century German physicists
Scientists from Wuppertal
University of Münster alumni